The moustached babbler (Malacopteron magnirostre) is a species of bird in the ground babbler family Pellorneidae. The species is also known as the brown-headed babbler or brown-headed tree-babbler.

Taxonomy and systematics
This species has two subspecies, the nominate race M. m. magnirostre and the subspecies M. m. cinereocapilla (Salvadori, 1868). A third subspecies, flavum,  from the Anamba Islands, is sometimes recognised but is usually merged into the nominate race. The specific name magnirostre comes from the Latin magnus for big and rostris for billed. The name for the subspecies cinereocapilla comes from the Latin cinereus for ash/ashy and capillus for headed.

Distribution and habitat
The moustached babbler is found in Sundaland. The nominate race is found in southern Myanmar and Thailand through Peninsular Malaysia and Sumatra, and the subspecies M. m. cinereocapilla is endemic to Borneo. Formerly, it could be found in the forests of Singapore, but it is now likely extinct there.

It is suggested that this species, since it prefers logged forest to primary forest, could be used as a habitat indicator.

Description
The plumage is dull brown above and whitish below.

Behaviour
The moustached babbler feeds on insects, including on beetles and locusts.

References

External links
 BirdLife fact sheet

moustached babbler
Birds of Malesia
moustached babbler
Taxonomy articles created by Polbot